This is a list of the National Register of Historic Places listings in Wheeler County, Texas.

This is intended to be a complete list of properties and districts listed on the National Register of Historic Places in Wheeler County, Texas. There are four properties listed on the National Register in the county. One property is also a Recorded Texas Historic Landmark.

Current listings

The locations of National Register properties may be seen in a mapping service provided.

|}

See also

National Register of Historic Places listings in Texas
Recorded Texas Historic Landmarks in Wheeler County

References

External links

Wheeler County, Texas
Wheeler County
Buildings and structures in Wheeler County, Texas